Suzanne Lloyd is a Canadian film and television actress who was born in Toronto.

Early years and career

Lloyd attended Pasadena Junior College.

In addition to her film work, she was a frequent guest star on both British and American television, including Gunsmoke (1959-1961), One Step Beyond, Bourbon Street Beat, The Islanders, Rescue 8, Buckskin, The Texan, Laramie, Lawman, Tales of Wells Fargo, Gunsmoke, Bonanza, The Avengers, Thriller, The Twilight Zone, Bat Masterson, Perry Mason, Walt Disney's Wonderful World of Color, Mike Hammer, Have Gun – Will Travel, Maverick, The Tab Hunter Show, and six episodes of The Saint. Lloyd had a recurring role as Raquel Toledano in the classic Zorro television series. She appeared in The Saint Episode "The High Fence" (1964) not listed below

Partial filmography

References

External links

  (archived)
 
 
 
 

Living people
Actresses from Toronto
Canadian film actresses
Canadian television actresses
Year of birth missing (living people)